The following is a list of lenses manufactured by Leica Camera.

List of Leica lenses

Leica screwmount (M39) lenses 

 Elmar 50 mm  collapsible
 Hektor 50 mm  collapsible
 Summar 50 mm  collapsible and rigid (very rare)
 Xenon 50 mm  rigid
 Summitar 50 mm  collapsible
 Summarit 50 mm  collapsible
 Summicron 50 mm  collapsible (1953)

Leica M lenses 

 Tri-Elmar-M 16-18-21 mm  ASPH.
 Tri-Elmar-M 28–35–50 mm  ASPH.
 Super-Elmar-M 18 mm  ASPH.
 Summilux-M 21 mm  ASPH.
 Elmarit-M 21 mm 
 Elmarit-M 21 mm  ASPH.
 Super-Angulon-M 
 Super-Angulon-M 
 Summilux-M 24 mm  ASPH.
 Elmarit-M 24 mm  ASPH.
 Elmar-M 24 mm  ASPH.
 Summaron-M 28mm .
 Summilux-M 28 mm  ASPH.
 Summicron-M 28 mm  ASPH.
 Elmarit-M 28 mm 
 Elmarit-M 28 mm  ASPH.
 Summilux 35 mm 
 Summilux-M 35 mm  ASPH.
 Summicron-M 35 mm 
 Summicron-M 35 mm  ASPH.
 Summarit-M 35 mm 
 Noctilux-M 50 mm  ASPH.
 Noctilux-M 50 mm 
 Noctilux-M 50 mm 
 Noctilux-M 75 mm 
 Summilux 50 mm 
 Summilux-M 50 mm  ASPH.
 Summarit 50 mm 
 Summicron-M 50 mm 
 Apo-Summicron-M 50 mm  ASPH.
 Summarit-M 50 mm 
 Elmar-M 50 mm 
 Summilux-M 75 mm 
 Apo-Summicron-M 75 mm  ASPH. 
 Summarit-M 75 mm 

 Elmarit-M 90 mm 
 Apo-Summicron-M 90 mm  ASPH.
 Summarit-M 90 mm 
 Macro-Elmar-M 90 mm 
 Elmarit-M 135 mm 
 Apo-Telyt-M 135 mm 
 Elmar 135 mm 
 Hektor 135 mm 

Note: Noctilux means -, Summilux means , Summicron means , Summarit means  in the current lineup ( in one of the 50 mm), Elmarit means , and Elmar means -. Noct, Lux and Cron are commonly used as short forms for Noctilux, Summilux and Summicron, respectively. For example, 50 Cron uniquely identifies the Summicron-M 50 mm  construction, although the exact version is not specified. Many Leica M lenses went through several revisions through the years.

Leica R lenses 
 Leica 15 mm  Super-Elmar-R – 1980 (Carl Zeiss design)
 Leica 15 mm  Super-Elmarit-R ASPH – 2001
 Leica 16 mm  Fisheye-Elmarit-R – 1970 (Minolta design and glass production)

 Leica 19 mm  Elmarit-R 1st version
 Leica 19 mm  Elmarit-R 2nd version – 1990
 Leica 21 mm  Super-Angulon-R – 1968–1992 (Schneider-Kreuznach design)
 Leica 21 mm  Super-Angulon-R – 1968 (Schneider-Kreuznach design)
 Leica 24 mm  Elmarit-R – 1970 (Minolta design and glass production)
 Leica 28 mm  PC-Super-Angulon-R (Schneider-Kreuznach design)
 Leica 28 mm  Elmarit-R 1st version – 1970
 Leica 28 mm  Elmarit-R 2nd version – 1994
 Leica 35 mm  PA-Curtagon-R (Schneider-Kreuznach design)
 Leica 35 mm  Elmarit-R 1st version – 1964
 Leica 35 mm  Elmarit-R 2nd version
 Leica 35 mm  Elmarit-R 3rd version
 Leica 35 mm  Elmarit-R 4th version (Built-in lens hood; 55mm filter)
 Leica 35 mm  Summicron-R 1st version – 1970
 Leica 35 mm  Summicron-R 2nd version – 1976
 Leica 35 mm  Summilux-R

 Leica 50 mm  Summicron-R 1st version – 1964
 Leica 50 mm  Summicron-R 2nd version – 1977 (built-in lens hood, 3-cam and R-cam only version)
 Leica 50 mm  Summilux-R 1st version
 Leica 50 mm  Summilux-R 2nd version
 Leica 50 mm  Summilux-R 3rd version – 1997 (ROM contacts)
 Leica 60 mm Macro-Elmarit-R 1st version – 1972 – outside bayonet lens hood fitting
 Leica 60 mm Macro-Elmarit-R dn2 version
 Leica 75 mm  Elcan-R code C-341 – extremely rare
 Leica 80mm  Summilux-R

 Leica 90 mm  Elmarit-R 1st version – 1964–1996
 Leica 90 mm  Elmarit-R 2nd version – 1983
 Leica 90 mm Summicron-R 1st version – 1969
 Leica 90 mm Summicron-R 2nd version –
 Leica 90 mm APO-Summicron-R ASPH – 2002
 Leica 90 mm  Elcan-R – extremely rare
 Leica 100 mm  Macro-Elmar-R bellows version
 Leica 100 mm  Macro-Elmar-R helical version
 Leica 100 mm  APO-Macro-Elmarit-R
 Leica 135 mm Elmarit-R 1st version – 1965
 Leica 135 mm Elmarit-R 2nd version

 Leica 180 mm  Elmar-R – 1976
 Leica 180 mm  Elmarit-R 1st version
 Leica 180 mm  Elmarit-R 2nd version
 Leica 180 mm  APO-Telyt-R – 1975–1998
 Leica 180 mm  APO-Elmarit-R – 1998
 Leica 180 mm  APO-Summicron-R
 Leica 180 mm  Elcan-R code C-303 – extremely rare
 Leica 250 mm  Telyt-R 1st version
 Leica 250 mm  Telyt-R 2nd version
 Leica 280 mm  Telyt-V
 Leica 280 mm  APO-Telyt-R
 Leica 280 mm  APO-Telyt-R – 1984–1997
 Leica 350 mm  Telyt-R
 Leica 400 mm  Telyt-R – 1968–1994
 Leica 400 mm  Telyt-R
 Leica 400 mm  APO-Telyt-R – 1992–96
 Leica 450 mm  Elcan-R, code C-329 – extremely rare
 Leica 500 mm  MR-Telyt-R
 Leica 560 mm  Telyt-R – 1971–1995
 Leica 560 mm  Telyt-R – 1966–1973
 Leica 800mm  Telyt-S – 1972–1995 (sold, during a promotional campaign, with a "free tripod" — a VW Fox)
 Leica modular APO-Telyt-R 260/400/560 head
 Leica modular APO-Telyt-R 400/560/800 head

 Leica 21 mm–35 mm – Vario-Elmar-R zoom – 2002
 Leica 28 mm–70 mm –4.5 Vario-Elmar-R zoom
 Leica 28 mm-90 mm -4.5 Vario-Elmarit-R ASPH
 Leica 70–180 mm  Vario-APO-Elmarit-R zoom
 Leica 35–70  Vario-Elmar-R zoom
 Leica 35–70 mm  Vario-Elmar-R zoom (Minolta design and glass production)
 Leica 35–70 mm  Vario-Elmarit-R ASPH zoom – 2000 (only 200 were made)
 Leica 70–210 mm  Vario-Elmar-R zoom (Minolta design and glass production)
 Leica 75–200 mm  Vario-Elmar-R – 1976–1984 (Minolta design and glass production)
 Leica 80–200 mm  Vario-Elmar-R zoom
 Leica 80–200 mm  Vario-Elmar-R zoom
 Leica 105–280 mm  Vario-Elmar-R zoom

Leica S lenses 
 Super-Elmar-S 1:3.5/24 mm ASPH.
 Elmarit-S 1:2.8/30 mm ASPH.
 Elmarit-S 1:2.8/30 mm ASPH. CS
 Summarit-S 1:2.5/35 mm ASPH.
 Summarit-S 1:2.5/35 mm ASPH. CS
 Elmarit-S 1:2.8/45 mm ASPH.
 Elmarit-S 1:2.8/45 mm ASPH. CS
 Summarit-S 1:2.5/70 mm ASPH.
 Summarit-S 1:2.5/70 mm ASPH. CS
 Summicron-S 1:2/100 mm ASPH.
 Apo-Macro-Summarit-S 1:2.5/120 mm
 Apo-Macro-Summarit-S 1:2.5/120 mm CS
 TS-APO-Elmar-S 1:5.6/120 mm ASPH. (Schneider-Kreuznach design)
 Apo-Elmar-S 1:3.5/180 mm ASPH.
 Apo-Elmar-S 1:3.5/180 mm ASPH. CS
 Vario-Elmar-S 1:3.5-5.6/30–90 mm ASPH.

Leica SL lenses (for L-mount, full frame) 

 Summilux-SL 1:1.4 / 50 ASPH.
 APO-Summicron-SL 1:2 / 21 ASPH. (According to the Leica roadmap for 2020)
 APO-Summicron-SL 1:2 / 24 ASPH. (According to the Leica roadmap for 2020)
 APO-Summicron-SL 1:2 / 28 ASPH. (According to the Leica roadmap for 2020)
 APO-Summicron-SL 1:2 / 35 ASPH.
 APO-Summicron-SL 1:2 / 50 ASPH.
 APO-Summicron-SL 1:2 / 75 ASPH.
 APO-Summicron-SL 1:2 / 90 ASPH.
 Super-Vario-Elmar-SL 1:3.5–4.5 / 16–35 ASPH.
 Vario-Elmarit-SL 1:2.8–4 / 24–90 ASPH.
 APO-Vario-Elmarit-SL 1:2.8–4 / 90–280

Leica Summilux-C Lenses (PL mount cinema lenses) 

 16 mm T/1.4
 18 mm T/1.4
 21 mm T/1.4
 25 mm T/1.4
 29 mm T/1.4
 35 mm T/1.4
 40 mm T/1.4
 50 mm T/1.4
 65 mm T/1.4
 75 mm T/1.4
 100 mm T/1.4
 135 mm T/1.4

Leica Summicron-C Lenses (PL mount cinema lenses) 

 15 mm T/2.0
 18 mm T/2.0
 21 mm T/2.0
 25 mm T/2.0
 29 mm T/2.0
 35 mm T/2.0
 40 mm T/2.0
 50 mm T/2.0
 75 mm T/2.0
 100 mm T/2.0
 135 mm T/2.0

References

External links 

 

 
Lens manufacturers